The following television stations operate on virtual channel 22 in the United States:

 K04QC-D in Palermo, California
 K12XP-D in Phoenix, Arizona
 K13UL-D in Hillsboro, New Mexico
 K15MI-D in Centralia/Chehalis, Washington
 K21OW-D in Lordsburg, New Mexico
 K22CU-D in Cortez, etc., Colorado
 K22HS-D in Eureka Springs, Arkansas
 K22JM-D in Gunnison, Colorado
 K22JN-D in Grand Junction, Colorado
 K22JQ-D in Ardmore, Oklahoma
 K22JS-D in Ashland, Oregon
 K22KD-D in Sioux Falls, South Dakota
 K22LJ-D in Mason City, Iowa
 K22OC-D in Fort Smith, Arkansas
 K22OG-D in Fargo, North Dakota
 K22OH-D in Helena, Montana
 K22OK-D in Waco, Texas
 K22OV-D in Caputa, South Dakota
 K22OW-D in Alexandria, Louisiana
 K25MP-D in Bonners Ferry, Idaho
 K28GJ-D in Hatch, New Mexico
 K28QE-D in Caballo, New Mexico
 K28QK-D in Pasco, Washington
 K29ED-D in Everett, Washington
 K30QI-D in Alamogordo, New Mexico
 K36KH-D in Alexandria, Minnesota
 KAOE-LD in Santa Fe, New Mexico
 KAWB in Brainerd, Minnesota
 KDCG-CD in Opelousas, Louisiana
 KEQI-LD in Dededo, Guam
 KFCT in Fort Collins, Colorado
 KFTS in Klamath Falls, Oregon
 KFXF-LD in Fairbanks, Alaska
 KLCW-TV in Wolfforth, Texas
 KLFB-LD in Salinas, California
 KLTJ in Galveston, Texas
 KMDF-LD in Midland, Texas
 KNAV-LD in Dallas, Texas
 KPXG-TV in Salem, Oregon
 KQFX-LD in Columbia, Missouri
 KRCB in Cotati, California
 KRID-LD in Boise, Idaho
 KRWG-TV in Las Cruces, New Mexico
 KSKN in Spokane, Washington
 KSQA in Topeka, Kansas
 KTOU-LD in Oklahoma City, Oklahoma
 KTUO-LD in Tulsa, Oklahoma
 KTVP-LD in Phoenix, Arizona
 KUMY-LD in Beaumont, Texas
 KWBJ-CD in Morgan City, Louisiana
 KWHY-TV in Los Angeles, California
 KZJO in Seattle, Washington
 KZMM-CD in Fresno, California
 KZVU-LD in Chico, California
 W22CY-D in Clarksburg, West Virginia
 W22EL-D in Vanderbilt, Michigan
 W22EN-D in Manteo, North Carolina
 W22EP-D in Starkville, Mississippi
 W22FH-D in Fort Wayne, Indiana
 W22FN-D in Wilmington, North Carolina
 WBMM in Tuskegee, Alabama
 WCBZ-CD in Marion, Ohio
 WCKV-LD in Clarksville, Tennessee
 WCLF in Clearwater, Florida
 WCTD-LD in Ducktown, Tennessee
 WCTE in Cookeville, Tennessee
 WEEL-LD in Tuscaloosa, Alabama
 WFGZ-LD in Lake City, Florida
 WFVX-LD in Bangor, Maine
 WFXQ-CD in Springfield, Massachusetts
 WGPS-LD in Fort Myers, Florida
 WHLT in Hattiesburg, Mississippi
 WJCL in Savannah, Georgia
 WKEF in Dayton, Ohio
 WKNX-LD in Pinconning, Michigan
 WKPI-TV in Pikeville, Kentucky
 WLEK-LD in Concord, New Hampshire
 WLFL in Raleigh, North Carolina
 WLWK-CD in Sturgeon Bay, Wisconsin
 WMEC in Macomb, Illinois
 WMNS-LD in Charlotte Amalie, U.S. Virgin Islands
 WMPT in Annapolis, Maryland
 WMTO-LD in Norfolk, Virginia
 WOVA-LD in Parkersburg, West Virginia
 WPFN-CD in Panama City, Florida
 WPNT in Pittsburgh, Pennsylvania
 WQXT-CD in St. Augustine, Florida
 WRJK-LD in Arlington Heights, Illinois
 WSBS-CD in Miami, etc., Florida
 WSBS-TV in Key West, Florida
 WSBT-TV in South Bend, Indiana
 WSKC-CD in Atlanta, Georgia
 WSST-TV in Cordele, Georgia
 WSWH-LD in Tuscaloosa, Alabama
 WTNO-CD in New Orleans, Louisiana
 WTOO-LD in Clearfield, Pennsylvania
 WTVU-CD in Syracuse, New York
 WVDO-LD in Carolina, Puerto Rico
 WVNY in Burlington, Vermont
 WVUT in Vincennes, Indiana
 WWLP in Springfield, Massachusetts
 WXNJ-LD in Wanaque, New Jersey
 WYOU in Scranton, Pennsylvania

The following television stations, which are no longer licensed, formerly operated on virtual channel 22:
 K06QG-D in Sioux City, Iowa
 K21CD-D in Ukiah, California
 K22JK-D in Moses Lake, Washington
 K22JU-D in Rapid City, South Dakota
 KWWF in Waterloo, Iowa
 WDQB-LD in Wilmington, North Carolina
 WEQA-LD in Florence, South Carolina
 WQDS-LD in Athens, Georgia

References

22 virtual